The Guangyuan Aoyuan Sports Center is a sports venue in Guangyuan, Sichuan, China. It includes an outdoor stadium with a seating capacity of 20,000, an indoor stadium with a capacity of 3,000, as well as outdoor sporting facilities including a football pitch, eight basketball courts, six tennis courts, eight badminton courts, a swimming pool, and other facilities. The center opened in 2010.

References

Football venues in China
Multi-purpose stadiums in China
Buildings and structures in Sichuan
2010 establishments in China